Yujiro Seto (born 27 January 2000) is a Japanese Paralympic judoka. He won one of the bronze medals in the men's 66 kg event at the 2020 Summer Paralympics held in Tokyo, Japan.

References 

Living people
2000 births
Japanese male judoka
Paralympic judoka of Japan
Paralympic bronze medalists for Japan
Paralympic medalists in judo
Judoka at the 2020 Summer Paralympics
Medalists at the 2020 Summer Paralympics
Place of birth missing (living people)
21st-century Japanese people